2013 Omiya Ardija season.

J1 League

League table

Match details

References

External links
 J.League official site

Omiya Ardija
Omiya Ardija seasons